Yvonne Ross is an American actress. She played the character of Corrie Turner in the film Fight for Your Life

Filmography
Fight for Your Life (1977)
Cover Me: Based on the True Life of an FBI Family (2000)

References

American actresses
Living people
Year of birth missing (living people)
Place of birth missing (living people)
21st-century American women